Yuriy Ajrapetjan (born 18 April 1988 in Yerevan) is a Ukrainian chess player of Armenian descent.

He studied at Tavrida National V.I. Vernadsky University in Simferopol and works at a bank.

He was awarded the FIDE International Master title in February 2005 and the Grandmaster title in January 2008.

Best results
1st at Simferopol 2004
2nd at the Crimea Championship 2006
1st at Simferopol 2007
1st at Alushta Spring 2007
1st at Alushta Autumn 2007.
At Alushta 2007, he acquired his norms for obtaining the title Grandmaster. He was rewarded the Grandmaster title when those norms appeared in the FIDE rating of January 2008.

His best Elo rating was 2537 in July 2009.

References

External links

1988 births
Chess grandmasters
Ukrainian chess players
Ukrainian people of Armenian descent
Living people